Corrina Martini (born 19 June 1985 in Winterberg, North Rhine-Westphalia) is a German luger who has competed since 2005. She won two medal at the FIL European Luge Championships 2010 in Sigulda with a silver in the women's singles and a bronze in the mixed team events.

Martini also finished 19th in the 2008-09 Luge World Cup.

References
FIL-Luge.org profile

External links 
 

1985 births
Living people
People from Winterberg
Sportspeople from Arnsberg (region)
German female lugers